Mattia Bevilacqua (born 17 June 1998) is an Italian former racing cyclist, who competed professionally for UCI ProTeam  from 2020 to 2021.

Major results
2016
 1st  Road race, National Junior Road Championships
 2nd Trofeo Citta di Loano
2017
 10th Gran Premio Industrie del Marmo
2018
 5th Trofeo Città di San Vendemiano
 8th Trofeo Piva
 9th Trofeo Edil C
2019
 10th Trofeo Edil C

References

External links

1998 births
Living people
Italian male cyclists
Sportspeople from Livorno
Cyclists from Tuscany